The Almonte is a river in Spain. The 97 km long river is a left tributary of the Tajo, the longest river of the Iberian peninsula. It lies in its entirety in the Extremadura region. 

Rivers of Spain
Rivers of Extremadura
Tributaries of the Tagus